The  is a mid-size crossover SUV manufactured and marketed by Nissan since May 2002 for the 2003 model year, and currently in its third generation.

As Nissan's first crossover SUV for the United States and Canada, the Murano was designed at Nissan America in La Jolla, California, and was based on the Nissan FF-L platform shared with the third generation Altima. The European version of the Murano began sales in 2004.

The Murano was Nissan's only crossover SUV in the United States until September 2007, when the Rogue went on sale. In Canada, the X-Trail had been on sale as Nissan's second car based SUV since 2004 as a model for 2005; it was replaced by the 2008 Rogue at the end of 2007. The Murano is sized between the Pathfinder and the now defunct Xterra (which was replaced by the Rogue as a compact SUV). A convertible variant, the Murano CrossCabriolet, was available for the second-generation model for the model years of 2011 to 2014.

The nameplate Murano derives from the Italian city of Murano and the namesake Murano art glass for which the city is widely known.

First generation (Z50; 2002)

The first generation Nissan Murano was unveiled in production form for the model year of 2003, at the 2002 New York International Auto Show. Available with standard front-wheel-drive (FWD) and optional all-wheel-drive (AWD), the Nissan Murano is one of the largest vehicles using a continuously variable transmission (CVT) during the time. Fuel economy was rated at 18 mpg in the city and 23 mpg on the highway (same mpg FWD and AWD on the new EPA specifications). 

Production started in the middle of May 2002, and the first vehicles shipped in early June for the United States and mid-July for Canadian markets. Sales in Europe started in 2004, following its European premiere at the 2004 Geneva Motor Show. An independent suspension on all wheels was used for class-leading ride and handling.

A full set of airbags, steel-reinforced cabin, and head restraints were safety features designed to protect the interior while VDC, ABS, electronic brakeforce distribution and brake assist were mechanical safety features. VDC incorporates a form of traction control.

The Murano received a crash test rating of five stars in all categories but vehicle rollover (four stars) from the United States National Highway Traffic Safety Administration (NHTSA).

For the model year of 2006 in North America, the Murano received some updates in the form of LED tail lamps and turn signals, standard color information screen, available backup camera (standard in Canada for all models), GPS and a restyled front end with some minor trim updates. September 2004, the Murano was introduced in Japan, replacing the Bassara MPV and exclusive to Nissan Red Stage locations, with a further introduction at Nissan Blue Stage locations in October, replacing the Terrano.

In Japan, the Murano is equipped with many optional features found in North America as standard equipment on Japanese models, including Nissan's GPS and internet-based navigation system called CarWings. Japanese models were available with two engine choices, the 3.5L V6 engine mated to a CVT transmission or a 2.5L four-cylinder engine with a 4-speed automatic transmission.

Murano GT-C 
Nissan’s Cranfield-based Technical Centre Europe produced a concept of the Murano called the Murano GT-C. The purpose was to gauge consumer interest in a low-volume performance-orientated version of the first generation Murano. The concept featured a raft of performance upgrades over the standard Murano including bigger brakes, revised suspension, exterior styling and a Garret turbo that increased power from 234ps to 350ps.

Second generation (Z51; 2007)

Nissan skipped the model year of 2008 with the introduction of the second generation Murano – as a model for 2009. The 2009 Murano made its debut at the 2007 Los Angeles Auto Show in November, and sales began in January 2008. The exterior and interior were redesigned.

The second generation Murano was initially offered in three trim levels: the base S, the mid grade SL, and the top level LE (Luxury Edition). The performance oriented SE model was discontinued. The S and SL are offered with standard FWD, with optional iAWD (Intelligent All Wheel Drive) available. The LE trim is iAWD only.

The second generation Murano included new features, some of which were optional or available only on the LE grade, including rain sensing wipers, double stitched leather seats, power rear lift gate, power fold up rear seats, iPod integration, and a hard-drive based, touchscreen navigation system. The S and SL feature aluminum interior accents, while the LE sports wood tone trim. Like the first generation model, there is no third row seat.

The second generation is based on the Nissan D platform, shared with the L32 Altima and the A35 Maxima. The engine is mated to a revised Continuously Variable Transmission with Adaptive Shift Control. EPA fuel economy is rated at 18 city / 23 highway.

Standard safety features on all trims include four wheel disc brakes with ABS, brake assist, and EBD; electronic stability control; and front, side, and side curtain airbags. The NHTSA awarded the second generation Murano four stars on the frontal crash test, and five stars for side impacts, worse than the first generation.

On September 29, 2008, Nissan released the second generation Murano in Japan, targeted mainly at men in their 30s, 40s and 50s. Nissan announced plans to sell the vehicle in 170 countries. The four-cylinder 2.5L QR engine continued to be offered as an option in Japan.

For the model year of 2011, the Murano was refreshed to include refreshed front and rear fascias, new headlights and LED taillights, and new 18 inch wheels on the outside. New interior changes included a new white meter color (as opposed to red/orange), new center stack plastic colors matching the leather trim, and added equipment to various trim levels. The refresh also added a new exterior color, "Graphite Blue" and for the 2013 model year the LE trim was renamed to Platinum.

In September 2011, Nissan launched the second-generation Murano in Indonesia. In April 2011, the Murano was officially withdrawn from the United Kingdom, due to disappointing sales.

Murano CrossCabriolet
Nissan premiered the Murano CrossCabriolet at the 2010 Los Angeles Auto Show, marketing it as "the world’s first all wheel drive crossover convertible."

Nissan began formally marketing the CrossCabriolet with the model year of 2011 — without further refreshes or any other trim levels during its production run. The crossover was only offered in the LE trim and had the same engine as a standard Murano.

The fully automatic, hydraulically operated cloth top has an automatic power latch/unlatch system, rear glass skylight, dual pop-up roll bars, 7.6 cf cargo capacity with the top down and 12.3 cf with the top up — and a Cd of 0.39. Its front doors are 7.9 inches longer than four door Murano front doors, with structural reinforcement from the A-pillar rearward.

The Murano CrossCabriolet was discontinued after the 2014 model year.

Third generation (Z52; 2014)

The third-generation Murano is not marketed in Japan, Australia and New Zealand, as it is not produced in right-hand drive. The nameplate has been discontinued due to sluggish sales, with the X-Trail taking its place.

The Nissan Murano made a return in Mexico after an absence for a decade after the second generation was discontinued in that market on April 11, 2018, as a 2019 model. For the Mexican market, it is offered only in the Advance and Exclusive trim lines and only offered in a V6 3.5-liter engine.

For the 2019 model year, Murano received an updated front and rear fascias as well as a new wheel design and quilted semi-aniline leather appointed seating became standard on the Platinum trim level and also gets new interior trim finishers, Light wood-tone on SV and SL trim levels with cashmere interior, Metallic trim on S, SV, and SL trim levels with graphite interior, and Dark wood-tone on the Platinum trim level. New exterior colors include Deep Blue Pearl, Mocha Almond Pearl, and Sunset Drift ChromaFlair.

For 2020, it kept the same design while receiving minimal changes, mostly safety features. The SV and SL models received the Nissan Safety Shield 360 as standard, which included automatic emergency braking with pedestrian detection, blind spot warning, rear cross-traffic alert, lane departure warning, rear automatic braking, and high-beam assist. It was facelifted in February 2020 for Mexico, dropping the Advance trim line and being only offered in the Platinum AWD trim line.

Since 2020, Murano production in North America shifted from Canton, Mississippi to the Nissan Smyrna Assembly Plant in Tennessee.

For 2021, Nissan's "Safety Shield 360" became standard on all Murano trim levels. A Special Edition package was offered on the SV trim level with 20-inch dark charcoal wheels, leatherette seats, special badging, heated front seats, and a dual panel panoramic moonroof.

Murano Hybrid
For the model year of 2016, Nissan introduced a hybrid version of the Murano. The Murano Hybrid was available in two trim levels, SL and Platinum. The Murano Hybrid features an electric motor, a 2.5-liter four cylinder engine, Intelligent Dual Clutch System, and a lithium-ion battery that is located under the center console. Hybrid components does not reduce passenger and cargo space. The hybrid version uses the so-called VSP (Vehicle Sound for Pedestrians) system that uses sound to help alert pedestrians of the presence of the vehicle, when it is being driven at a low speed in the electric drive mode.

Markets

China 
For China, the Nissan Murano sold by Dongfeng Nissan is offered in the XE, XL, XL Plus and S/C trim lines and only offered in a 2.5-litre engine.

Russia 
The Russian model is offered in five trim lines; Mid, High, High+, Top, and Top+.

Safety
It has ventilated disc brakes on all wheels.

Latin NCAP
The US-made Murano in its most basic Latin American configuration with 7 airbags received 2 stars for adult occupants and 4 stars for toddlers from Latin NCAP in 2016.

The updated US-made Murano in its most basic Latin American configuration with 7 airbags received 5 stars for adult occupants and 3 stars for toddlers from Latin NCAP in 2017.

Awards and recognition
 2003 Nominated for the North American Truck of the Year award.
 2007 Motorist Choice best premium mid-size SUV by AutoPacific.
 2010 Murano received the highest ratings in the front-, side-, and rear-impact evaluations performed by the Insurance Institute for Highway Safety.
 2010 Murano received NHTSA's Highest Government Side-Impact Safety Rating (five stars).
 2015 Ward's 10 Best Interiors Winner

Sales

References

External links

Official website (United States)

Murano
Cars introduced in 2002
2010s cars
2020s cars
Mid-size sport utility vehicles
Crossover sport utility vehicles
Front-wheel-drive vehicles
All-wheel-drive vehicles
Latin NCAP large off-road
Vehicles with CVT transmission